Cyclohexyl nitrite is an organic compound, with formula C6H11NO2. It is the ester of cyclohexanol and nitrous acid, i.e. it is an alkyl nitrite. Like amyl nitrite and butyl nitrite, it acts as an antianginal due to vasodilation. The compound is colorless, volatile liquid.

Safety
Inhaling the cyclohexyl nitrite vapor can lead to headache and dangerously low blood pressure.

Recreational use 

Since early 2020 cyclohexyl nitrite has become popular as a recreational drug called poppers, mostly labeled as Canadian formula in various online stores that offer purchase of the drug. When used as an inhalant the effects are described as - stimulating ejaculation and orgasm, relaxation of sphincter muscles during anal sex, therefore making this compound appealing to the gay community, although users describe the experience as not even close compared to other alkyl nitrites.

References

Antianginals
Antidotes
Alkyl nitrites
Cyclohexyl compounds